Brazilian Sign Language is the sign language used by deaf communities of urban Brazil. It is also known in short as Libras and variously abbreviated as LSB, LGB or LSCB ("Brazilian Cities Sign Language").

Recognition and status
Brazilian Sign Language is well-established; several dictionaries, instructional videos and a number of articles on the linguistic features of the language have been published. It has dialects across Brazil reflecting regional and sociocultural differences.

A strong sign language law was passed by the National Congress of Brazil on April 24, 2002, and (in 2005) is in the process of being implemented. The law mandates the use of Brazilian Sign Language in education and government services.

Educational approaches have evolved from oralism to Total Communication and bilingualism.

In addition to being recognized nationally since 2002, Libras has also been made official at the municipal level in Belo Horizonte, Curitiba and Salvador. In Rio de Janeiro, the teaching of Libras was made official in the curriculum of the municipal school system.

April 24th was made official as the National Day of Brazilian Sign Language.

Alphabet
Libras fingerspelling uses a one-handed manual alphabet similar to that used by the French Sign Language family.

There are 44 distinct handshapes used in the language.

Writing
Sutton SignWriting is the dominant writing system in Brazil. A master's in linguistics dissertation titled "A arte de escrever em Libras" by Gabriela Otaviani Barbosa found that SignWriting is used in 18 Federal Universities and in 12 public schools in Brazil.

Historical efforts were commonly transcribed using Portuguese words, written in upper case, to stand for each equivalent Libras morpheme.
 
Transcription of Libras signs using SignWriting has been in place since at least 1997 with the SignNet Project in Porto Alegre and Fernando Capovilla's dictionaries in São Paulo. The University of Santa Catarina at Florianopolis (UFSC) has required courses in SignWriting as the preferred form of LIBRAS transcription.

SignWriting is cited as being useful in the pedagogy of young children.

The Federal University of Santa Catarina has accepted a dissertation written in Brazilian Sign Language using Sutton SignWriting for a master's degree in linguistics.  The dissertation "A escrita de expressões não manuais gramaticais em sentenças da Libras pelo Sistema signwriting" by João Paulo Ampessan states that "the data indicate the need for [non-manual expressions] usage in writing sign language".

Deaf and sign language organizations

The most important deaf organization is FENEIS, the Federação Nacional de Educação e Integração dos Surdos (National Federation of Deaf Education and Integration). There are a number of regional organizations in Curitiba, Caxias do Sul and Rio Grande do Sul.

Classification
Wittmann (1991) posits that Brazilian Sign Language is a language isolate (a 'prototype' sign language), though one developed through stimulus diffusion from an existing sign language, likely Portuguese Sign Language and/or French Sign Language.

See also
Ka'apor Sign Language, an unrelated Indigenous sign language of Brazil.

Footnotes

References
Gama, Flausine José da Costa: Iconographia dos Signaes dos Surdos-Mudos.[Iconography of Signs for the Deaf-Mute]. Rio de Janeiro : E.+H.Laemmert 1875
Capovilla, F. C., and W. D. Raphael, eds. 2001. Dicionário enciclopédico ilustrado trilíngüe da Língua de Sinais Brasileira: Vols. 1 (Sinais de A a L) & 2 (Sinais de M a Z). [Trilingual illustrated encyclopedic dictionary of Brazilian Sign Language, Vols. 1 and 2] São Paulo: Edusp, FAPESP, Fundação Vitae, Feneis, Brasil Telecom. Volume One:  Volume Two: 
de Souza, Guilherme Lourenco. "Verb agreement in Brazilian Sign Language: morphophonology, syntax & semantics." (2018). Universidade Federal de Minas Gerais: doctoral dissertation.
Lourenço, Guilherme. "Verb agreement in Brazilian Sign Language: Morphophonology, syntax & semantics." Sign Language & Linguistics 22, no. 2 (2019): 275–281.
Xavier, André Nogueira and Sherman Wilcox. 2014. Necessity and possibility modals in Brazilian Sign Language (Libras). Linguistic Typology 18(3): 449 – 488.

Sign language isolates
Languages of Brazil
Deaf culture in Brazil
Sign languages of Brazil